Casting Crowns is a contemporary Christian and Christian rock band started in 1999 by youth pastor Mark Hall, who serves as the band's lead vocalist, as part of a youth group at First Baptist Church in Downtown Daytona Beach, Florida. They later moved to Stockbridge, Georgia, and more members joined. Some members of the band currently work as ministers for Eagle's Landing First Baptist Church in McDonough, Georgia. The band has won a Grammy and a Dove Award.

History

Early years and initial success 
Christian rock group Casting Crowns began as a student worship band in Daytona Beach, Florida, in 1999. Led by singer, songwriter, and youth pastor Mark Hall, the group initially included guitarists Juan DeVevo and Hector Cervantes, violinist Melodee DeVevo, and drummer Rob Cervantes (a.k.a. Chavez). The group relocated to Georgia, in 2001, adding Chris Huffman on bass, Megan Garrett on keyboards and accordion, and drummer Andy Williams. This augmented version of Casting Crowns released two independent albums on CD, both of which were well received in the Atlanta area. Both independent albums were efforts on the part of Mark Hall and the rest of the group as outreach projects for youth in the area. The group won the GMA regional songwriters competition at Palm Beach Atlantic University, West Palm Beach, Florida, in both the "Best Song" and the "Best Artist" categories in 2004. Although the group was not searching for a record label, one of the group's albums found its way into the hands of Mark Miller, lead singer for country group Sawyer Brown, who was struck by Casting Crowns' driving pop/rock style and Hall's vocal delivery of his hard-hitting but devout songs. Miller signed Casting Crowns to his fledgling Beach Street Records, a division of Reunion Records with distribution by the Provident Label Group, making Casting Crowns the first artist signed to Beach Street Records.

Mark Miller took the group into the studio along with co-producer Steven Curtis Chapman, himself a popular artist on the CCM musical scene. The resulting eponymous album, Casting Crowns, was released in 2003 on the Beach Street imprint. The album quickly made them one of the fastest selling debut artists in Christian music history. The album's third single, "Voice of Truth", spent a record-breaking fourteen consecutive weeks at No. 1 beginning in 2003. "Voice of Truth" is also used in the trailer and the ending from the movie Facing the Giants. The album was certified platinum in 2005, and in 2011, the group received their first gold certification for a single for the song 'Who Am I' from their debut record.

Lifesong followed in 2005, debuting at No. 9 on the Billboard 200 chart. The album had three singles: "Lifesong", "Praise You in this Storm", and "Does Anybody Hear Her?". "Lifesong" spent nine weeks in the top spot, with "Praise You in This Storm" remaining at No. 1 for seven weeks. Apart from being successful in the charts, Lifesong earned Casting Crowns their first Grammy Award for their work on the album in 2006.

In 2006, the group released Lifesong Live, which included live performances of songs from their studio album Lifesong.

The band's third studio album The Altar and the Door debuted at No. 2 on the Billboard 200 albums chart and No. 1 on the Hot Christian Albums chart upon its release in August 2007.  Ten weeks after the album's release date, it was certified gold by the RIAA. On September 27, 2007, the band embarked on the 'Altar and the Door' tour with Leeland and John Waller . The tour was highly successful, grossing $4.4 million in ticket sales. Casting Crowns broke their own record in 2007 when the single "East to West" from The Altar and the Door hit sixteen consecutive weeks at No. 1. The song ended up enjoying the top spot for a total of nineteen weeks, now their most successful single to date. "Slow Fade" was also released as a single, and was included in the soundtrack of the Kirk Cameron film Fireproof.

In 2008, Casting Crowns scored their eighth number one hit with "I Heard the Bells on Christmas Day", a track from their newly released Christmas album titled Peace on Earth.

Recent years 
Casting Crowns was one of the rare American bands to ever have been invited to North Korea. They attended the 2009 Spring Friendship Arts Festival in Pyongyang where they performed with the Annie Moses Band. This was Casting Crowns' second invitation to the festival sponsored by Global Resource Services, the first time being in 2007. On August 30, 2009, Casting Crowns performed on Huckabee, Mike Huckabee's political show.

Casting Crowns' fourth major studio album, Until the Whole World Hears, was released on November 17, 2009, debuting at No. 4 on the Billboard 200 and selling over 167,000 copies in its first week alone, setting a new record for the highest Christian album debut in history. It was certified gold within four weeks. The title track and first single from the album became the group's ninth No. 1 single in January 2010.

In April 2010, Casting Crowns won the Dove Award for Artist of the Year, their first ever win in that category. A music video for the title track of Until the Whole World Hears was posted on the band's YouTube page on August 23, 2010.

The track "Glorious Day" was released as a single in 2011 and reached No. 1 on Billboard Christian Songs during the week of April 23, 2011.

"Courageous", was released as a single on July 19, 2011. The music video for the song was released on June 13, 2011 and promotes the film Courageous. The song was featured on, Come to the Well, which was released on October 18, 2011. "Jesus, Friend of Sinners", the album's second single, was released in 2012.

In 2012, Josh Mix joined the band, replacing guitar player Hector Cervantes.

The Acoustic Sessions: Volume One, was released on January 22, 2013.

In early 2013, the band recorded their own version of the hymn "I Surrender All" for the album Jesus, Firm Foundation. Also, lead singer Mark Hall recorded the title song with Mike Donehey of Tenth Avenue North, Steven Curtis Chapman, and Mandisa. To end the year, the band joined Chapman, Natalie Grant, Matthew West, and other artists on "The Story Tour 2013" performing songs from The Story.

In September 2013, the band released "All You've Ever Wanted", the first single from Thrive which was released on January 28, 2014. and charted No. 6 in Billboards Top 200 in its first week.

In early 2015, Casting Crowns released the hymns-album, Glorious Day - Hymns of Faith, exclusively through Cracker Barrel Old Country Stores. The album includes Casting Crowns' Until the Whole World Hears singles "Glorious Day" and "Blessed Redeemer", and acoustic versions of "If We Are the Body" and "Praise You in This Storm" as well as eight hymns, mostly covers.

In November 2015, the band released A Live Worship Experience.  The album was recorded live at the band's home church, Eagle's Landing First Baptist Church, and features 12 songs, including worship songs "Great Are You Lord," and "Good Good Father," and Casting Crowns' songs "Just Be Held" and "Thrive."

On September 16, 2016, the band released their seventh studio album, The Very Next Thing, which was preceded by the single "One Step Away". It was followed by a second single from the album, "Oh My Soul".

On October 20, 2017, the band released a new EP, It's Finally Christmas, and embarked on "A Glorious Christmas" tour with for KING & COUNTRY shortly after its release.

On October 11, 2018, the band announced Only Jesus, scheduled for release on November 16, 2018, with a video introduction by Mark Hall and made the title track available to those on their fans list. On October 12, 2018, they also released a second track, "Nobody", featuring Matthew West, to fans. On October 19, they released a third track, "In the Hands of the Potter" to those on their fans list. On September 25, they released the deluxe edition.

On June 16, 2021, the band released "Scars in Heaven".

Andy Williams, the band's former drummer, died on July 9, 2021 at age 49 from injuries sustained in a June 27 motorcycle accident.

Ministry
In keeping with The Great Commission, Hall describes their music as a "ministry of discipleship".

Mark Hall is youth minister at Eagle's Landing First Baptist Church in McDonough, Georgia, while the other members are active in their respective churches. They do the band part-time around their full-time work of raising families and church service. They often tour from Thursday to Saturday so that they can be home for church on Sunday morning and Wednesday night.

Members
Current
 Mark Hall – lead vocals and songwriter (1999–present)
 Juan DeVevo – guitar and background vocals (1999–present)
 John Michael Hall - bass (2021-present)
 Megan Garrett – piano, keyboards, backing vocals (2001–present)
 Melodee DeVevo – violin, backing vocals, cello (1999–present)
 Jack Williams - drums (2021-present)
 Josh Mix – lead guitar and background vocals (2013–present)

Former
 Andy Williams – drums (2001–2009)
 Hector Cervantes – lead guitar and background vocals (1999–2013)
 Chris Huffman – bass and background vocals (2001–2021)
 Brian Scoggin - drums (2009-2021)

Books
Lifestories by Mark Hall
Your Own Jesus by Mark Hall
The Well by Mark Hall
Thrive by Mark Hall
The Very Next Thing by Mark Hall
Only Jesus by Mark Hall

Discography

 Casting Crowns''' (2001)
 What If the Whole World Prayed (2002)
 Casting Crowns (2003)
 Lifesong (2005)
 The Altar and the Door (2007)
 Peace on Earth (2008)
 Until the Whole World Hears (2009)
 Come to the Well (2011)
 Thrive (2014)
 The Very Next Thing (2016)
 Only Jesus (2018)
 Healer'' (2022)

Achievements
 Career sales have exceeded 10 million records.
 Voted CCM Readers' Choice Awards "Favorite Band", "Favorite New Artist" and "Favorite Album"  in 2005.
 "Lifesong" voted "Inspirational Single of the Year" by online music fans in the 2005 CCMSingles.Net Awards.
 "Praise You in this Storm" was the fifth most played song of 2006 according to R&R magazine.
 "East to West" voted "AC Single of the Year" and "Inspirational Single of the Year" by online music fans in the 2007 CCMSingles.Net Awards.
 Casting Crowns was the most played artist on Christian Radio in 2007, according to Radio & Records Weekly charts (12/10).
 Casting Crowns is the second-fastest Christian band in history to have their first two albums certified platinum, the fastest being Jars of Clay.

See also
List of awards and nominations received by Casting Crowns

References

External links
 
Casting Crowns Artist Profile on Christian Music Review 
The Altar and the Door album review on Christian Music Review
Casting Crowns on WorshipSong
The Altar & The Door Tour 2009 concert review from NewReleaseTuesday.com
Official YouTube Channel
Official GodTube Channel

American pop music groups
Beach Street Records artists
Christian rock groups from Florida
Grammy Award winners
Musical groups established in 1999
Musicians from Daytona Beach, Florida
Performers of contemporary Christian music
Reunion Records artists
Sony BMG artists
1999 establishments in Florida